José Andrade may refer to:

 José Antonio Andrade, Spanish colonel
 José Leandro Andrade (1901–1957), Uruguayan football midfielder
 José Andrade (footballer, born 1970), Cape Verdean football striker
 José E. Andrade (born 1979), American professor